Io e la mamma is an Italian sitcom.

Cast

Delia Scala: Delia Mantelli 
Gerry Scotti: Gigi Mantelli
Gea Lionello: Elena Mantelli
Jacopo Sarno: Paolino
Enzo Garinei: Barozzi

See also
List of Italian television series

External links
 

Italian television series
Canale 5 original programming